This article is about the history of lesbian, gay, bisexual and transgender (LGBT) people in Greece.

1st millennium BC

2nd millennium AD
 In 1858, the Ottoman Empire decriminalizes homosexual relationships.
 Homosexual practice was decriminalized in 1951.

3rd millennium AD
 In November 2003, NCRTV fined one of the TV networks in Greece, Mega, with 100,000 Euros, partly for having aired a kiss between two male characters of the popular TV show 'Klise ta Matia' (Greek: Κλείσε τα Μάτια). In December 2006, Greece's Council of State, the country's Supreme administrative court, annulled this decision though, ruling that NCRTV's fine was unconstitutional.
In 2015, civil unions were legalized for same-sex couples 
In 2017, the Legal Gender Recognition Law is passed 
On May 6, 2018, same-sex couples in civil partnerships Greece gained the right to foster children, although adoption remained illegal.

See also
History of LGBT
LGBT rights in Greece

References

External links